The Exposed is the 27th book in the Animorphs series, written by K.A. Applegate. It is known to have been ghostwritten by Laura Battyanyi-Weiss, although due to an editorial oversight, Battyanyi-Weiss was uncredited for this book. It is narrated by Rachel.

The front cover quote is "They thought they'd seen it all. They were wrong...." The inside front cover quote is "Rachel's getting a sinking feeling..."

Plot summary
During a shopping trip with Cassie, Rachel sees Erek's hologram malfunctioning. They barely manage to get him away before other humans notice. Soon they discover every Chee is having trouble with their technology, particularly their holograms, because of interferences with the Pemalite ship hidden in the ocean. The vast majority of the Chee have adequately hidden themselves, so humans cannot discover they are aliens. However, two are still in danger.

One of the Chee in danger, Lourdes, is hidden in a flophouse where drug fencing occurs, but a SWAT team - with a Controller member - are about to raid the house. The Animorphs successfully rescue her.

Next, the Animorphs need to come up with a plan in order to reach the Pemalite ship, so they can fix the malfunctioning technology. They struggle to think of an appropriate morph for the bottom of the ocean. Cassie realizes a giant squid would work, but they still do not know how to get close to one. They do know sperm whales capture giant squids. Thankfully, a sperm whale has been beached. Rachel and Tobias acquire the whale's DNA, morph into the whale, dive into the ocean, and find and then end up battling a squid. Finally, all the Animorphs acquire the squid and dive together.

They notice several Yeerk bug fighters en route to the Pemalite ship as well, following the signal. Reaching it first, they use the single-digit access code to infiltrate it and fix the Chee programming, but then a self-destruct sequence is initiated too.

The group is confronted by a being called the Drode, an aide of sorts to the Crayak. The Drode threatens and insults them all. He shows some bizarre fondness for Rachel and tells her that if she wants to gain favor with the Crayak, then she should kill Jake. The Yeerks also emerge into the ship, and the group must stand and fight them before allowing them to gain control. But as the battle reaches a climax, Erek appears - to the shock of the Drode - and activates a violence-dispeller. The Yeerks and Animorphs are forced to leave the ship, and the Chee have their holograms restored.

Morphs

Animorphs books
1999 science fiction novels
1999 American novels
Underwater novels